New religious movements and cults have appeared as themes or subjects in literature and popular culture, while notable representatives of such groups have themselves produced a large body of literary works.

Beginning in the 1700s authors in the English-speaking world began introducing members of "cults" as antagonists.  Satanists, Sects of the Latter Day Saint movement, Yakuzas, Triads, and Thuggees were popular choices.  In the twentieth century concern for the rights and feelings of religious minorities led authors to invent fictional cults for their villains to belong to.
Fictional cults continue to be popular in film, television, and gaming in the same way.

Background 

A new religious movement (NRM) is a religious community or ethical, spiritual, or philosophical group of modern origins, which has a peripheral place within its nation's dominant religious culture. NRMs may be novel in origin or they may be part of a wider religion, in which case they will be distinct from pre-existing denominations.  Scholars continue to try to reach definitions and define boundaries.

A NRM may be one of a wide range of movements ranging from those with loose affiliations based on novel approaches to spirituality or religion to communitarian enterprises that demand a considerable amount of group conformity and a social identity that separates their adherents from mainstream society.  Scholars have estimated that NRMs now number in the tens of thousands worldwide, with most in Asia and Africa.  Most have only a few members, some have thousands, and only very few have more than a million.

The word cult in current usage is a pejorative term for a new religious movement or other group whose beliefs or practices are considered abnormal or bizarre by the larger society, often without a clear or consistent definition.

Literature

Early twentieth century 

In Dashiell Hammett's The Dain Curse (1929), much of the mystery puzzle revolves around the Temple of the Holy Grail, a fictitious California circle that Hammett's characters repeatedly describe as a "cult". Hammett depicts it as starting as a scam, although the putative leader begins to believe in his own fraudulent claims.

A.E.W. Mason, in The Prisoner in the Opal (1928), one of his Inspector Hanaud mysteries, describes the unmasking of a Satanist cult.

The Italian novelist Sibilla Aleramo, in Amo, dunque sono (I Love, Therefore, I Am) (1927) depicted Julius Evola's UR Group, a hermetical circle and intellectual movement — strongly influenced by Anthroposophy — that attempted to provide a spiritual direction to Benito Mussolini's fascism.
Aleramo described the character based on her former lover Evola as "inhuman, an icy architect of acrobatic theories, vain, vicious, perverse." Aleramo based her hero on Giulio Parise, who would unsuccessfully attempt to oust the pro-Fascist Evola as the circle's leader in 1928, resulting in an announcement by Evola that he would thenceforth exert "an absolute unity of direction" over the circle's publications.

Mid and late twentieth century
Science-fiction writer Robert A. Heinlein wrote two novels that deal with fictional cult-like groups. A leading figure in his early "Future History" series (see If This Goes On--, a short novel published in Revolt in 2100), Nehemiah Scudder, a religious "prophet", becomes dictator of the United States. By his own admission in an afterword, Heinlein poured into this book his distrust of all forms of religious fundamentalism, the Ku Klux Klan, the Communist Party and other movements that he regarded as authoritarian. Heinlein also stated in the afterword that he had worked out the plot of other books about Scudder, but had decided not to write them — in part because he found Scudder so unpleasant. Heinlein's  novel Stranger in a Strange Land features two cults: the "Dionysian Church of the New Revelation, Fosterite", and the protagonist Valentine Michael Smith's own "Church of All Worlds". Heinlein treats of the motives and methods of religious leaders in some detail.

In That Hideous Strength, C.S. Lewis describes the National Institute for Co-ordinated Experiments, or "NICE", a quasi-governmental front concealing a kind of doomsday cult that worships a disembodied head kept alive by scientific means. Lewis' novel is notable for its elaboration of his 1944 address "The Inner Ring." The latter work criticizes the lust to "belong" to a powerful clique — a common human failing that Lewis believed was the basis for people being seduced into power-hungry and spiritually twisted movements.

In William Campbell Gault's Sweet Wild Wench, L.A. private eye Joe Puma investigates the "Children of Proton", a fictional cult that has attracted the support of the daughter of a wealthy businessman.

Gore Vidal's Messiah depicts the rise of a cult leader, while Vidal's Kalki, a science-fiction novel, recounts how a small but scientifically adept cult kills off the entire human race by means of germ warfare.

Twenty-first century
Popular French author Michel Houellebecq's 2005 science-fiction novel, The Possibility of an Island, describes a cloning group that resembles the Raëlians.

Robert Muchamore has written a book for teenagers, Divine Madness, about a religious cult that has a vast number of members: the main characters of the book must infiltrate the cult to discover a sinister plot.

The novel Godless centers around a teenager who forms a religious cult that worships his hometown's water tower.

Literary works by founders of new trends or movements 

Aleister Crowley, founder of the English-speaking branch of the Ordo Templi Orientis and of a short-lived commune (the "Abbey of Thelema") in Sicily, wrote poetry (anthologized in 1917 in The Oxford Book of English Mystical Verse) and novels (Diary of a Drug Fiend (1922) and Moonchild (1929)). Crowley died in 1947. His autobiography, The Confessions of Aleister Crowley, republished in 1969, attracted much attention. The Encyclopedia of Fantasy describes Crowley's fiction and his manuals on the occult as examples of "lifestyle fantasy".

The travel-writer, poet and painter Nicholas Roerich, the founder of Agni Yoga, expressed his spiritual beliefs through his depiction of the stark mountains of Central Asia. His classic travel-books include Heart of Asia: Memoirs from the Himalayas (1929) and Shambhala: In Search of the New Era (1930).

L. Ron Hubbard, the founder of Scientology, worked as a contributing author in the Golden Age of Science Fiction (1930s to 1950s) and in the horror and fantasy genres. In a bibliographical study of his works, Marco Frenschkowski agrees with Stephen King in regarding Fear (1940) as one of the major horror tales of the 20th century, and praises "its imaginative use of the prosaic and its demythologizing of traditional weird fiction themes". Other works which Frenschkowski cites as notable include Typewriter in the Sky (1940), To the Stars (1950), the best-selling Battlefield Earth (1982), and the ten-volume Mission Earth (1985–1987). Frenschkowski concludes that although Hubbard's fiction has received excessive praise from his followers, science-fiction critics leery of Scientology have  underrated it. John Clute and Peter Nichols, however, manage to praise much of Hubbard's oeuvre while also raising questions about the thematic link to Scientology. Hubbard's "canny utilization of superman protagonists" in his early work, they argue, came to "tantalize" s-f writers and fans "with visions of transcendental power" and may explain why so many early followers of Hubbard's movement came from the s-f community.

G.I. Gurdjieff, the Greek-Armenian mystic and spiritual teacher who introduced and taught the Fourth Way, authored three literary works that comprise his All and Everything trilogy. The best known, Meetings with Remarkable Men, a memoir of Gurdjieff's youthful search for spiritual truth, has become a minor classic. Peter Brook made it into a film (1979). The trilogy also includes Beelzebub's Tales to His Grandson, a curious melange of philosophy, humor and science-fiction that some regard as a masterpiece. P.L. Travers, author of the Mary Poppins series and a disciple of Gurdjieff, described Beelzebub as "soaring off into space, like a great, lumbering flying cathedral". Martin Seymour-Smith included Beelzebub in his 100 Most Influential Books Ever Written, characterising it as "...the most convincing fusion of Eastern and Western thought that has yet been seen." Gurdjieff's final volume, Life is Real Only Then, When 'I Am', consists of an incomplete text published posthumously.

Eli Siegel, the founder of Aesthetic Realism, wrote highly regarded poetry. William Carlos Williams described his "Hot Afternoons Have Been in Montana" (1925) as his "major poem", and wrote that Siegel "belongs in the first ranks of our living artists". Other critics and poets who praised Siegel's work included Selden Rodman and Kenneth Rexroth; the latter wrote that "it's about time Eli Siegel was moved up into the ranks of our acknowledged Leading Poets."

Important non-fiction writers among founders of movements

Helena Blavatsky, the Russian adventuress who founded Theosophy, wrote Isis Unveiled (1887) and The Secret Doctrine (1888), and had an immense cultural and intellectual influence in the late 19th and early 20th centuries, helping to stimulate the Indian nationalist movement, parapsychology, the fantasy literary genre,
and the New Age movement. The Encyclopedia of Fantasy describes her two major books as "enormous, entrancing honeypots of myth, fairytale, speculation, fabrication and tomfoolery".

Rudolf Steiner (1861–1925), the founder of Anthroposophy, wrote in a variety of fields (his collected works total 350 volumes) and influenced such figures as the novelist Herman Hesse and the philosopher Owen Barfield. Through his writings and lectures, Steiner stimulated the development of the cooperative movement, alternative medicine, organic farming, the Waldorf schools, and "eurythmy" in modern dance.

References

External links

Fiction about cults